Sex education in India to the organised delivery by Indian governments and non-profits of material regarding sex, sexuality, and pregnancy. The three categories of sex education in India are (1) the sex education courses targeted at adolescents in school, (2) family planning for adults, and (3) HIV/AIDS Prevention Education. This article outlines the current state of, efficacy of, and opposition to these types of sex education in India. For history regarding family planning in India, see Family Planning in India.

Current state of sexual health

Sex and pregnancy 
The sex ratio in India is skewed towards males, with 943 girls born per 1000 males in 2011. This is propagated by several factors, including lower caloric intake by mothers, female infanticide, and cultural preference for boys. However, the most plausible explanation for fewer female than male births is prenatal sex determination, followed by induced abortion of female fetuses. This suggests that potential mothers are socialised to believe that having a female child is detrimental to their family, either economically or socially.

In some areas of India, many young men and women are delaying their marriages to pursue their careers, a result of rising education levels. However, most Indian households are conservative and prohibit discussions about sex. In rural areas and urban slums, girls are often married early and they don't go into marriage equipped with any knowledge of sex. This manifests itself on a larger scale. According to UNICEF, about 240 million women alive in India today were married before the age of 18 even though the average age of women at first marriage has increased to 20.6.

Adolescent fertility usually occurs within marriage because girls are encouraged to reproduce as early as they can after they are married. Therefore, 36% of children (aged 13–16) and 64% of adolescents (aged 17–19) are pregnant or already mothers. Conversely, pregnancy outside of wedlock carries severe social stigma in India. Medical termination of pregnancy is available to few and the attitude of the providers towards such women is not amicable. As a result, they may attempt unsafe abortions or abandon the child. Such stigmatised women may also commit suicide.

Contraception is rarely used within or outside of marriage. Based on a National Family Health Survey conducted in 1992–1993, 7.1% of married women (aged 15–19) use contraception, compared to 21% among women (aged 20–24). Additionally, adolescents lack access to contraceptive methods like oral contraceptives and diaphragms. Lack of contraception use is coupled with lack of availability of safe abortions. While five million abortions occur annually in India, only 10% of those are performed within the structures of a high-quality hospital.

HIV/AIDS and other STIs 
More than four million people are estimated to be infected with HIV in India – the highest proportion of any country in the world. Slightly more than one half are men, and almost one half are women.

Premarital sex has risen in India, and a large proportion of it is unprotected. Additionally, married men often engage in risky behavior by having unprotected sex with multiple partners, which can include commercial sex workers. Finally, the cultural patriarchal structure in India makes it unlikely that women will be able to ensure that their husbands are monogamous (South et al.). This makes young Indians vulnerable to teenage pregnancy and sexually transmitted diseases (STDs) (Parwej et al.). Studies have found that lower educated groups such as truck drivers are especially vulnerable to STDs due to lack of knowledge and prevalence of misconceptions.

Types of sex education

For adolescents 
There are about 190 million adolescents in India - a demographic in which over 30% of people are illiterate. Disparities in gender at this age can often be explained by relatively poor access to reproductive health care and the fact that girls often have less access to food, which adversely affects their growth patterns. Additionally, adolescent girls often work long hours in the home with no opportunity for employment (Selvan et al.).

Adolescents, both males and females, tend to not be informed about sexuality. This is often caused by lack of education in general (but sex education in particular) and conservative attitudes towards sex.

Efficacy 
Parents are often reluctant to teach accurate and relevant information about sex to adolescents because of the stigma associated with the topic. More than taboo, mothers especially feel like talking about sex is embarrassing and dirty (Tripathi et al.).

This same attitude is held by teachers. First, when the National Council of Educational Research and Training initiated sex education, they structured it as a part of existing studies, rather than a separate subject. However, teachers tried to avoid teaching the topic. Second, a school in Gujarat implemented a system where students could anonymously drop letters into a box for trained counselors to read. The nature of these questions tended to split by sex. Girls' questions tended to focus on menstruation, physical appearance, and 'normal' sexual behavior while boys' questions tended to focus on nocturnal emission, masturbation and body size (Abraham et al.). Though these programmes exist, they are unable to reach girls who are not in school, a significant section of the population. Other than the specific initiatives outlined above, there are very few services that cater specifically to adolescents. Though NGOs and local schools are trying to push for more, teachers rarely cover issues like sexuality and reproductive health. Additionally, NGO reach is limited even though they can reach out-of-school adolescents (Tripathi et al.).

In a 2005 study in Chandigarh, a reproductive health education package was prepared after consulting parents and teachers to address cultural sensitivities. The package had a guidebook for the instructor and a book for the students for self-study. The students (aged 15–20; mean age was 16.47) were grouped and subjected to two types of education methods. In the first method, education was directly provided to them in a classroom setting by an instructor. In the second method, some students were selected and educated by instructors. Following that, they were encouraged to engage in peer education. A third group was reserved as a control. The first group showed the most improvement in their knowledge after the nine-month programme. The peer-education group showed knowledge levels similar to the first group after a three-month course. The increase in knowledge level was considered significant after comparison to the control group.

Surveys have shown that adolescents learn a significant amount about sex from the media, including books and movies. However, exposure is not equivalent to accuracy. Though teens interacted with media that talked about sex, they did not glean accurate information regarding the reproductive process. Additionally, exposure to media didn't teach adolescents about healthy emotional growth or responsible adulthood.

Finally, the level of awareness and knowledge regarding sex education among adolescents is higher among those living in urban areas than among those living in rural areas. This is caused by higher-quality education and more exposure to globalised points of view (Abraham).

Opposition 
There has been significant opposition to sex education, specifically for adolescents. In 2007, when sex education curriculum was promoted by India's Ministry of Human Resource Development, controversy developed. Many opponents believed that sex education would corrupt youth and be anathema to traditional Indian values. Additionally, they believed it would lead to promiscuity and irresponsible behavior. Finally, they argued that sex education was a western construct that was being forced upon India. These arguments cause states like Gujarat, Madhya Pradesh, Maharashtra, Karnataka, Rajasthan, Chhattisgarh and Goa to ban sex education programming.

In March 2007, the Maharashtra state government banned sex education in schools. The ban came after the ruling and opposition Members of the Legislative Assembly claimed that western countries had forced the Central government to implement the program. In April 2007 Basavaraj Horatti, the Karnataka Minister for Primary and Secondary Education, said that the program has been put on hold after complaints from teachers. The teachers had complained that the books were oriented towards increasing the sales of condoms and that they were sexually provocative. A women's organisation, Akhila Bharatha Mahila Samskruthika Sanghatane, also protested the course in the state.

On May 15, 2007, the Chief Minister of Madhya Pradesh Shivraj Singh Chouhan removed sex education from the state curriculum on the grounds that it offended Indian values, acting on the advice of Rashtriya Swayamsevak Sangh (RSS) ideologue Dinanath Batra. Batra suggested that yoga be added to the curriculum instead. This view was criticised by S. Anandhi, a scholar of gender issues, who wrote that sex-education was vital for combatting child sexual abuse and the spread of HIV/AIDS. Later that year, Batra wrote a letter on behalf of the Shiksha Bachao Andolan Samiti, which stated that teachers who followed the sex-education curriculum could be jailed for two years on the charge of "outraging the modesty of a woman."

In May 2007, Rajasthan Chief Minister Vasundhara Raje wrote a letter to Arjun Singh, the Union Minister of Human Resource Development. In the letter, she stated that children in Class IX and XI did not require sex education because they were in the early stages of puberty. The state Education Minister Ghansyam Tiwari stated that they already had a life skills course called Jeevan Shaili which was sufficient.

In June 2009, Orissa Education Minister Bishnu Charan Das stated that they were delaying introduction of sex education by a year as a result of protests by teachers' organisations and students' political groups. Rajendra Burma of All India Democratic Students' Organisation (AIDSO) claimed that it would cause innocent students to become too curious about sex.

In July 2009, a teachers' association protested the introduction of sex education in Uttar Pradesh. Om Prakash Sharma, the chief of the association, said that it would result in embarrassing questions from students. He threatened to burn the books on a bonfire if they were not withdrawn.

Ram Madhav of Rashtriya Swayamsevak Sangh (RSS) called sex education unfit for Indian society. He instead proposed that workshops be held for adults only to warn them against a promiscuous lifestyle. Prakash Javadekar of the Bharatiya Janata Party (BJP) proposed that sex education should consist of abstinence-only education. Another BJP leader Murli Manohar Joshi stated that the course would disturb the mental development of children and claimed that multinational companies were behind this to boost the sales of condoms.

Opponents of sex education for adolescents are swayed if sex education is deemed to be culturally sensitive and in line with Indian values. This can be achieved if the government and NGOs work in tandem to create curriculum that is acceptable to schools and the community. This trend may change as years progress because adolescents tend to have a more liberal view towards sex than adults.

Family planning for adults 

Family planning in India has had a varied history. During India's Emergency period in the 1970s, the government implemented a population-control policy which targeted lower-caste individuals. Because the United States used food aid as leverage, India was incentivised to create a program that would influence lower-caste individuals to not have children. This program was eventually disbanded because of the lack of hygiene associated with the procedures and the nearly coercive techniques that were used (Connelly). (see Family planning in India)

India's family planning programmes are mainly run by the government in conjunction with NGOs. Because these programs are often quota-based, they take two forms: sterilisation programmes and contraceptive programmes (Gray et al.). Both use an incentive-based approach, where families are often given kitchen items or cash to undergo procedures (Bhatnagar et al.).

Efficacy 
The efficacy of India's family planning programs is dependent on the paradigm that is being used. Programs like Accredited Social Health Activist (ASHA) encourage women to register pregnancies and visit local health centres, and also encourage family planning through sterilisation. ASHA also  holds information meetings and raise awareness on such issues as women's health, disease, social determinants of health, nutrition and sanitation. Additionally, they serve as counsellors on adolescent and female sexual and reproductive health (Scott). Past hospital care, ASHA also gives out free birth control pills and condoms which remove the stigma associated with couples buying contraceptives at drug stores (Scott).

Opposition 
First, the most significant criticisms of India's family planning program are those that advocate that it should be education-based rather than quota-based. They argue that India's program isn't sustainable because it does not stop women from marrying early or from spacing their pregnancies. Second, critics state that India's program does not consider the psyche of women who often undergo irreversible procedures like sterilisation because it doesn't provide the infrastructure for regular follow-ups. Finally, critics state that the programme is inherently gendered because most sterilisations are performed on women even though the procedure is less invasive for men (Vicziany).

HIV/AIDS and STD prevention education 

Because HIV/AIDS has been deemed a health crisis in India, prevention techniques have been set as a priority by the government which have been pushing NGOs to implement programming that focuses on training, support, and outreach. HIV/AIDS prevention education in India has been focused on educational materials like newspapers and pamphlets as well as conversations with educated professionals.

Efficacy 
In a study conducted in Tamil Nadu, 29% of women and 58% of men attending an outpatient clinic were aware of AIDS/STDs, however only 12% of women and 26% of men attending an STD clinic were aware of AIDS. The conclusion from this study was that mass media had been more effective at disseminating information about HIV/AIDS than the radio. However, this study also showed that mothers were not knowledgeable about Mother-to-Infant transmission because the information hadn't filtered down to them.

Additionally, a 2008 survey conducted among 11 and 12 class girls (aged 14 to 19; mean age was 16.38) in South Delhi found that 71% had no knowledge about the effects of genital herpes. 43% did not know the effects of syphilis and 28% did not know gonorrhoea was an STD. 46% thought the all STDs, except AIDS, could be cured. The major sources of information about STDs and safe sex among the girls were their friends (76%), media (72%), books and magazines (65%) or the internet (52%). 48% felt that they could not talk to their parents about sex.

Opposition 
Opposition to HIV/AIDS prevention education in India has been scarce because of the recognition of the importance of stopping this disease. However, there has been a hesitance to acknowledge and interact with men who have sex with men (MSM). This has decreased the efficacy of programming because of the stigma associated with this population.

Advocacy organisations and movements

The Family Planning Association of India (FPAI) was established in 1949. It was formed with the aim to safeguard the health of women by preventing too many and too closely spaced pregnancies. In 1952, it established its first clinic where it provide advice to family planning, infertility, and family counseling.

The Society for Nutrition, Education & Health Action (SNEHA) was established in the 1990s and is located in Mumbai, India. From children's health all the way to sexual assault prevention, it works to promote awareness of women's autonomy, health, and sexuality.

Talking About Reproductive and Sexual Health Issues (TARSHI) was established in 1996 and is located in New Delhi, India. TARSHI works to expand sexual and reproductive choices by operating from an affirmative and rights based perspective - a perspective that is often antithetical to common cultural beliefs.

Nirantar Trust promotes gender equality, especially for girls from marginalised communities, and was started in 1993. By considering factors like caste, sexuality, religion, class, and ethnicity, Nirantar works to develop feminist leadership.

The Sonagachi Project is a peer education project which was started in 1992. It encourages sex-workers in West Bengal to insist on condoms. The project has successfully increased condom usage and reduced STD levels among sex-workers in West Bengal.

On September 25, 2018, Prime Minister Narenda Modi launched the Ayushman Bharat Yojana program- a national program focused on making holistic improvements in India's health care systems by unifying India's various health systems into one program. Under the Ayushman Bharat, the Modi government has stated they are striving for the achievement of Sustainable Development Goals 2030 and see youth as a key demographic to achieve this.

In a white-paper released in April 2018, the Ministry of Health & Family Welfare and Ministry of Human Resource & Development, Government of India released sexual education guidelines in schools. This landmark paper represented the first cohesive efforts by India's federal government to address this issue. This initiative has been highly controversial- an RSS affiliated organization recently stated that "there is no need for teaching sex education in schools or making it a part of curriculum. If required, counselling can be provided for a student in schools.” Nonetheless, by taking a significant step in recognizing the significant risks that girls and women in India face, the Modi government has taken a significant step forward.

Specific guidelines in the Ayushman Bharat have promoted a program of selected teachers as health and wellness ambassadors. “Teachers with good communication skills, and ability to connect with students should be selected. The teachers from science, physical education background may be given preference. The age of teachers selected as Health and Wellness Ambassadors should be preferably below 45 years.” These individuals are selected to carry out a specialized curriculum and be a resource for students in improving sexual and reproductive health, preventive substance misuse and preventing injuries and violence amongst other health related outcomes.

To measure impact, a data collection and analysis initiative has been set up and will annually collect data regarding the percentage of students receiving information regarding sexual and reproductive health.

See also
 National AIDS Control Organisation
 Family Planning Association of India

References

Further reading

External links
 National AIDS Control Organisation

India
Health education in India
Sexuality in India